"Hangar 18" is a song by American thrash metal band Megadeth from their 1990 studio album Rust in Peace. Hangar 18 is located at Wright-Patterson Air Force Base near Dayton, Ohio, and it is speculated that an alien aircraft was brought there from Roswell in 1947. The song reached number 25 on the Irish Singles Chart, also reached number 26 on the UK Singles Chart.

Art
The cover of Rust in Peace, the album on which the song appears, depicts the band's mascot, Vic Rattlehead, and a number of world leaders viewing an alien in a cryogenic chamber, a clear reference to the track. Both the album's cover and single art were designed by the same artist, Ed Repka.

Music
A unique feature about the song is that the bass uses a different tuning from the two lead guitars, the bass being in Drop D while the guitars are in standard tuning. The intro is a rapidly strummed version of the D minor arpeggio that Mustaine wrote for the Metallica instrumental track "The Call of Ktulu", which was the final Metallica song for which he was given writing credit.

Sequel
A sequel to "Hangar 18", called "Return to Hangar" was included on Megadeth's ninth album The World Needs a Hero. It tells the fictional story of the life-forms said to be contained in Hangar 18 coming back to life and killing those inside the building before escaping.

Recognition
"Hangar 18" was nominated for Best Metal Performance at the 34th Annual Grammy Awards. It won a Concrete Foundations Award for Top Radio Cut at the 1991 Foundations Forum.

Accolades

Music video
The "Hangar 18" video is themed after the song's lyrical concept. It depicts the torture of aliens and, at the end, shows all the band members in freezing chambers. The video was shot at the Scattergood Generating Station. It was filmed in one of the main power generating buildings and it was directed and produced by Primetime Emmy Award Winning Visual Effects Supervisor,  Paul Stephen Boyington, Some of the performances and the visual effects for the video were created and produced at Boyington's visual effects studio in Culver City CA. Paul S. Boyington  also created the visual effects for Tim Burton's film Ed Wood. Coincidentally, the band would film the video for "Crush 'Em" on this same site nine years later. An edited version of "Hangar 18" is typically shown on MTV2 which has the song length cut down drastically. During the intro to the video the song "Dawn Patrol" from the Rust in Peace album can be heard in the background.

Track listing
 US CD single (C2 15662)
 "Hangar 18" (AOR Edit) – 3:17
 "Hangar 18" (LP Version) – 5:14
 "The Conjuring" (Live) – 5:06
 "Hook in Mouth" (Live) – 4:28

 Live tracks recorded at Wembley Arena, London, England on October 14, 1990.

 UK 12" LP single (12CLG 604)
 "Hangar 18" – 5:11
 "Hangar 18" (Live) – 5:14
 "The Conjuring" (Live) – 5:06
 "Hook in Mouth" (Live) – 4:28

 Live tracks recorded at Wembley Arena, London, England on October 14, 1990.

Charts

Personnel
 Dave Mustaine – guitars, vocals
 Marty Friedman – guitars
 David Ellefson – bass
 Nick Menza – drums

References

Megadeth songs
1990 songs
1991 singles
Songs about extraterrestrial life
Songs written by Dave Mustaine
Albums with cover art by Ed Repka